Mihail Kogălniceanu is a commune located in Ialomița County, Muntenia, Romania. It is composed of two villages, Hagieni and Mihail Kogălniceanu. The village was named after 19th century Romanian politician Mihail Kogălniceanu.

References

Communes in Ialomița County
Localities in Muntenia